Kotel may refer to:

Western Wall, or Kotel in Hebrew, a wall of the Jewish Temple in Jerusalem
Kotel, Bulgaria, a town in Bulgaria
Kotel Pass, a mountain pass in Bulgaria
Kotel Gap, a saddle in the South Shetland Islands, Antarctica
Kotel, Sodražica, a settlement in Slovenia
Kotel Peak, in a mountain range Krkonoše in Czech Republic